Florence Bayard Bird,  (January 15, 1908 – July 18, 1998) was a Canadian broadcaster, journalist, and Senator. She is best known for her work as chairwoman of Royal Commission on the Status of Women.

Born Florence Rhein in Philadelphia, Pennsylvania, she attended Bryn Mawr College and in 1928 married journalist John Bird. They moved to Montreal in 1931. In 1937, they moved to Winnipeg where her husband worked for the Winnipeg Tribune. She also appeared on CBC Radio and Television as Anne Francis, a political analyst. Francis [Bird] made several appearances on the panel show, Fighting Words in the early 1960s.

She is best remembered for her work as chair of the Royal Commission on the Status of Women.

She was a member of the Senate of Canada from March 23, 1978 until January 15, 1983.

In 1971, she was invested as a Companion of the Order of Canada. In 1983, she was named a recipient of the Governor General's Awards in Commemoration of the Persons Case. She was a member of the Junior League.

Archives 
There is a Florence Bird fonds at Library and Archives Canada.

References

External links 

Equality First: The Royal Commission on the Status of Women

1908 births
1998 deaths
American emigrants to Canada
Canadian senators from Ontario
Companions of the Order of Canada
Liberal Party of Canada senators
Bryn Mawr College alumni
Women members of the Senate of Canada
Women in Ontario politics
20th-century Canadian lawyers
Governor General's Award in Commemoration of the Persons Case winners
20th-century Canadian women politicians
Members of the Junior League